Cottica Lawa (often called Cottica) is a village in the district of Sipaliwini, Suriname. It is located in the east, along the Marowijne River and the border with French Guiana. The village has a school, and a clinic.

History

During the 18th century, the Aluku people settled in Cottica. Boni became a major leader and conducted raids against Dutch plantations. Resulting intermittent warfare with Dutch militia, military and mercenaries, between 1768 and 1793, resulted in many Aluku seeking refuge in Papaïchton and other villages on the French side of the Marowijne River. On 25 May 1891, the Aluku people opted for French citizenship. 

The village of Cottica was resettled in 1902, and is the only settlement in Suriname. The village is not under the authority of the granman of the Aluku. Captain Bayo, who was the chief at the time of the founding, asked permission from the Surinamese government to be officially installed. Op 21 April 1903, there was an official meeting with the Governor. Bayo insisted that his granman was Ochi of the Aluku and not granman Oseyse of the Ndyuka. This resulted in a stalemate which lasted until 1938 when Captain Nasinengee was officially installed as village chief.

The view from the village is dominated by the Cottica Mountain, which rises to a height of 744 metres.

References

Bibliography
 
 

Aluku settlements
French Guiana–Suriname border crossings
Populated places in Sipaliwini District